The Fall of the Pagoda is a semi-autobiographical novel written by Eileen Chang. Originally written in English in 1963, it was published posthumously by Hong Kong University Press on 15 April 2010. Zhao Pihui translated it into Chinese.

Language
The novel was written originally by Eileen Chang in English rather than Chinese, although the author was Chinese. Its author Eileen Chang lived in Shanghai where she spent her childhood. So the translator translated it into Shanghai dialect which can depict their lives vividly.

Before its publication, the executor of Eileen Chang's estate, Roland Soong, decided to show people The Fall of the Pagoda in bilingual, both English and Chinese.

According to the voluminous correspondence between Stephen Soong and Eileen Chang, the writer planned to translate it into Chinese but she was afraid that the story about a young girl's childhood cannot stimulate the reader's appetite. So the plan was terminated.

Background of the book
The Fall of the Pagoda is a semi-autobiographical novel written originally by Eileen Chang in English.  She finished writing the book in 1963 while she was in the United States. Eileen Chang decided to launch her American career with this book and The Book of Change but failed to find a publisher. In this book, she depicted her childhood years in Tianjin and Shanghai of the 1930s, while the Book of Change revolved around her wartime student days in Hong Kong.

Plot summary
The Fall of the Pagoda tells a narrative story about the childhood life of a girl, Lute, born in a noble family which is in a process of moral and financial decline. As a young girl, her mother followed her aunt to go abroad, and her father was addicted to opium, leaving her and her little brother to live with their servants, aunt Tong, aunt He, aunt Qin, etc.

Her father presided over their family. But he did not work due to a negative attitude to life and the addiction to opium. Lute's mother, Lu, a woman in the vanguard of female self-reliance, decided to divorce with her father, the patriarch who was adrift in post-Qing China. Maybe due to her special family background, the little girl was different in some significant way from others of the same age. Her psychological age is much older than actual age.

Lute's sickly brother, Hill, as a boy, was the important child in this family because he would be the successor of his father, Yuxi. The young boy was cosseted, over-supervised and beaten so that he was weak and morose. Lute was often ignored and had more freedom to do what she wanted.  She was given to those of no consequence. Lute grew up around servants, the sprawling, extended family existed in a sea of gossip, scandal, jealousy and fear.  They were bound together by their need for money, and the terror of destitution. They lived on the family's ever-diminishing wealth and tarnished prestige, pretending loyalty while pursuing their own survival and pleasure. Through young Lute's child clear eyes, those adults sometimes were hypocritical; even her parents were relentlessly selfish.

Characters

Lute
Lute is the main character in this novel. The whole story tells about the young girl's childhood. She was left to the care of servants, and the companionship of her sickly brother. Unlike her brother, Lute was placed in a place of no consequence but also was given more freedom to do what she wanted.

She was born in a fading aristocratic family in Shanghai. Around her, contradictions and aberrations are normal in Lute's family. Lute grows up watching the adults around her, and there is much to see. The sprawling, extended family and their ever-present servants exist in a sea of gossip, scandal, jealousy and fear. This is a household immersed in a decaying grandeur amid the intoxicating smell of opium. For Lute, the family was like a pagoda imprisoning her which she spent all her life to escape, albeit reluctantly.

It was hard for her to give it up and terminate her memory of the family completely. People most think her father hurt Lute more. But in this novel, you may find out a truth that her mother actually was the person who hurt Lute more. As Lute said to Dew (her mother), not father: "He never hurt me because I never loved him".

Hill
Hill, Lute's young brother, was sickly and infected with tuberculosis by his step-mother. As the only boy of the family, he would be the successor of his father. Compared to his elder sister, the boy was cosseted, over-supervised and beaten so that he was weak and unsociable. Most of time, he kept silent to everything around him and no one knew him, even his only elder sister who got along with him every day. Hill died of the negligence of parents, just 17 years old. His death seemed like a secret to Lute to which she never can find the key.

Dew
Dew, Lute and Hill's mother, was an open-minded woman who had the courage to divorce with her husband in that old days fulling of feudal ideology. But she was also selfish and cruel to give up her little daughter and son. Due to the abnormal family relationship, young Lute always observed the world around her with distrust. Dew became the very person who hurt Lute the most. Generally speaking, she was not a qualified mother.

Yuxi
Yuxi was the master of the noble family. He indulged himself in debauchery and divorced his wife, Dew-Lute and Hill's mother. Usually, he did not have enough time to get along with his children because of opium addiction.

Servants
There were many servants in this noble family, such as aunt Tong, aunt Qin, aunt He and so on. Taking aunt He for example, she brought up Yuxi's father, Yuxi and Yuxi's daughter, Lute. But at last, aunt He was ejected from the family which she served almost all her life. This was the servants' fate. In that old days, they were always in a powerless position suffering oppression and enslavement.

Social factors
Eileen Chang lived during a period of transition in China.

The author and her work
Eileen Chang, whose real name is Zhang Ying (张瑛), was born in a decaying noble family. She has the extremely prominent family background that her grandfather, Zhang Peilun (张佩纶)was a noted Qing Dynasty statesman; her grandmother Li Juou (李鞠耦) was the firstborn daughter of Li Hongzhang (李鸿章), minister of Qing state court. Eileen Chang is now recognized as one of the greatest modern Chinese writers, though she was completely erased from official histories in mainland China for her first husband Hu Lancheng (胡兰成). She was the most popular writer in Japanese-occupied Shanghai during World War II, with English and Chinese stories focusing on human frailties rather than nationalist propaganda. For her non-committal politics and idiosyncrasies, she was boycotted by fellow writers after the war and forced to the margins of literary respectability.

Eileen Chang is noted for writing that deals with relationship between male and female in the history of modern Chinese literature. Being a prolific and exceptional writer in modern China, she combined the art with life perfectly and created a large number of outstanding literary works.  Her novels, plays, essays and literary comments such as Lust, Caution, Jin Suo Ji, Love in a Fallen City, Eighteen Springs (novel) and The Fall of the Pagoda helped her gain reputation and had set up a unique art building for her.

References

External links
In English
 Entry on Hong Kong University Press website
 Book review at The Asian Review of Books
In Chinese
 https://web.archive.org/web/20100806153430/http://book.sina.com.cn/nzt/zhangailing/
 http://www.tianyabook.com/zhangailing/

Novels by Eileen Chang
Novels set in China
Novels published posthumously
2010 American novels
Fiction set in the 1930s
Hong Kong University Press books